The Kuwait national cricket team is the team that represents Kuwait in international cricket. The team is organised by the Cricket Kuwait, which has been an associate member of the International Cricket Council (ICC) since 2005, having previously been an affiliate member since 1998. Kuwait made its international debut in 1979, but has only played regularly at international level since the early 2000s, appearing regularly in Asian Cricket Council tournaments since then. Beginning in the early 2010s, the side appeared in several World Cricket League events, although it was relegated back to regional level after the 2013 Division Six tournament.

In 2018 former South African international Herschelle Gibbs was appointed coach of Kuwait for the 2020 ICC World Twenty20 qualification process.

History

The Kuwait Cricket Association was formed in 1996 and they became an affiliate member of the ICC two years later.

21st century

2000 - 2017

They participated in the ACC Trophy for the first time in 2000, but couldn't progress beyond the first round, a performance they repeated in the 2002 tournament.

In 2004, Kuwait pulled off a series off upsets to finish in third place in that year's ACC Trophy, only just missing out on qualification for the 2005 ICC Trophy. They did qualify for the repêchage tournament in early 2005 in Kuala Lumpur, Malaysia, in which they finished sixth after losing to the Cayman Islands in a play-off.

In February 2006, Kuwait finished third out of five teams when they hosted the ACC Middle East Cup. In August, they took part in the ACC Trophy, but were unable to reproduce their strong 2004 performance. They were eliminated in the first round when a tie with Hong Kong left them in third place in their group on run rate. A win in this match would have seen them through to the quarter finals.

In 2007 Kuwait played in the ACC Twenty20 Cup, which they also hosted. They finished third in the tournament, beating the UAE by three runs in a play-off.

Kuwait has participated in several World Cricket League tournaments, hosting and winning Division Eight in 2010; winning Division Seven in Botswana in May 2011; and coming third in Division Six in Malaysia in September 2011. Kuwait set one of the lowest ever T20 targets during the 2014 Asian Games.

2018-Present
In April 2018, the ICC decided to grant full Twenty20 International (T20I) status to all its members. Therefore, all Twenty20 matches played between Kuwait and other ICC members after 1 January 2019 will be a full T20I.

Kuwait made its Twenty20 International debut on 20 January 2019, defeating Maldives by eight wickets in the 2019 ACC Western Region T20 at Al Emarat Cricket Stadium, Muscat, Oman.

Tournament history

ACC Trophy

2000: First round
2002: First round
2004: 3rd place
2006: First round
2008: 8th place
2010: 7th place
2012: 7th place
2014: 3rd place

ACC Twenty20 Cup

2007: 3rd place
2009: 4th place
2011: 7th place
2013: 5th place
2015: 2nd place

World Cricket League

 2010 Division Eight: Champions – promoted
 2010 Division Seven: Champions – promoted
 2011 Division Six: 3rd place
 2013 Division Six: 6th place – relegated to regional tournaments

Asian Games

2014: QF

Asia Cup Qualifier 
2018: Did not participate
2022: 2nd place

ACC Western Region T20
2019: 4th place
2020: Runner up (Qualified for 2022 Asia Cup Qualifier)

Records

International Match Summary — Kuwait
 
Last updated 13 March 2023

Twenty20 International 
 Highest team total: 210/4 v Bahrain, 26 February 2020 at Oman Cricket Academy Ground, Muscat
 Highest individual score: 103, Ravija Sandaruwan v Bahrain, 23 January 2019 at Oman Cricket Academy Ground, Muscat
 Best individual bowling figures: 4/5, Mohammed Aslam v Iran, 25 February 2020 at Oman Cricket Academy Ground, Muscat

Most T20I runs for Kuwait

Most T20I wickets for Kuwait

T20I record versus other nations

Records complete to T20I #2021. Last updated 12 March 2023.

Administration and support staff

See also 
 List of Kuwait Twenty20 International cricketers
 Kuwait women's national cricket team

References

Cricket in Kuwait
National cricket teams
Cricket
Kuwait in international cricket